John Thomas Schedler is the former Secretary of State of Louisiana. He resigned in 2018 after sexual harassment accusations were made against him.

In February 2019, he sued the State of Louisiana wanting to be reimbursed attorneys fees and costs in the amount of $14,308 as well as reimbursement for “funds he paid in the original case.”

References

1950 births
21st-century American politicians
Living people
Louisiana state senators
Secretaries of State of Louisiana